Chakrulo (transliterated: chak'rulo) is a Georgian polyphonic choral folk song. It is a three-part song from the region of Kakheti, dramatising preparations for a battle. It is characterised by two highly ornamented individual vocal parts over a choral foundation.

When Georgian vocal polyphony was recognized by UNESCO as an Intangible Heritage masterpiece in 2001, Chakrulo was cited as a prime example. Chakrulo was one of 29 musical compositions included on the Voyager Golden Records that were sent into space on Voyager 2 on 20 August 1977 and Voyager 1 on 5 September 1977.

See also 
 UNESCO Intangible Cultural Heritage Lists
 Music of Georgia (country)

References

Songs of Georgia (country)
Contents of the Voyager Golden Record